One Way Out may refer to:

 One Way Out (album), the 2004 live album by The Allman Brothers Band
 One Way Out (film), the 1955 British crime drama film starring Jill Adams and Eddie Byrne
 One Way Out (2002 film), a 2002 crime drama starring James Belushi
 "One Way Out" (song), the blues song recorded by Sonny Boy Williamson II, Elmore James, and The Allman Brothers Band
 One Way Out (TV series), the Discovery Channel TV series featuring escape artist Jonathan Goodwin